The Subprefecture of Campo Limpo is one of 32 subprefectures of the city of São Paulo, Brazil.  It comprises three districts: Campo Limpo, Capão Redondo, and Vila Andrade. The slum of Paraisópolis, the second largest of the city and surrounded by middle-to-upper class apartment buildings, is located here.

References

Subprefectures of São Paulo